Joaquim Pedro Salgado Filho (2 July 1888 - 30 July 1950) was a Brazilian lawyer, political leader and influential figure in the separation of the Brazilian Air Force from the Army.

Joaquim Pedro Salgado Filho was born the son of Joaquim Pedro Salgado and Maria Josefa Artayeta Palmeiro on 2 July 1888 in Porto Alegre, Rio Grande do Sul. He supported Getulio Vargas in the Revolution of 1930, working in the Federal District police (1930-1932), then Minister of Labour (1932-1934), congressman (1935-1937), Minister of Aeronautics (1941-1945) and Senator (1947-1950). He was also president of the Brazilian Labor Party from 1948 until his death.

It was one of the creators of the National Air Mail and Air Force School, which resulted in the separation of the Brazilian Air Force of the Army. He stimulated the creation of airports for commercial aviation in Brazil.

External links
Joaquim Pedro Salgado Filho, Dr. - Ministro da Aeronáutica 
Salgado Filho

1888 births
1950 deaths
20th-century Brazilian lawyers
Members of the Federal Senate (Brazil)
Vargas Era